State Highway 167 (abbreviated SH-167) is a state highway near Tulsa, Oklahoma.

SH-167 has no lettered spur routes.

Route description
SH-167 begins in the south at Exit 240A of I-44/US-412/SH-66 in the city of Catoosa. From there, SH-167 heads north on 193rd East Ave. About one and a half miles north of I-44, the highway crosses a railroad, then continues north to cross Bird Creek.  The route ends at SH-266 just west of the Port of Catoosa.

Junction list

References

167
Transportation in Rogers County, Oklahoma